Bozkuş is a quarter of the town Çardaklı, Atkaracalar District, Çankırı Province, Turkey. Its population is 265 (2021).

References

Populated places in Atkaracalar District